Wolverine is an action video game developed by Software Creations and published by LJN for the NES, and was released in North America in 1991. It is a licensed game based on the Marvel Comics superhero of the same name, as well as the X-Men.

Story
Wolverine has been captured by his old foes Magneto and Sabretooth. Stranded on a deserted island, Wolverine must survive deadly enemies and traps, concluding with a battle with Magneto and Sabretooth.

Gameplay
The player controls Wolverine, who has been imprisoned on a vast island, through various stages, into a final battle against evil mutants Magneto and Sabretooth. Along with icons to restore health, or to gain extra lives, special icons can be located to allow other X-Men characters, such as Jubilee, Havok, and Psylocke to offer advice or temporary aid.

Wolverine's basic moves are jumping, ducking, punching, and kicking. He can bring out his legendary powerful claws with a push of the "Select" button, but every time the claws are used, his energy is depleted. Energy is regained by consuming food and beverages, such as hamburgers and soft drinks. If the player kills enough minor characters, Wolverine will temporarily shift into a "Berzerker" mode.

Unlike many other NES games, where the player's character is given a grace period of invulnerability after sustaining damage, Wolverine's energy is simply drained for as long as he is in contact with an enemy or hazard.  Another difference is that at the end of a level, except for the final two, there is no boss to defeat.

Reception
In a retrospective of video games featuring Wolverine, IGN mocked the NES game for not being faithful to the comics as well as its high difficulty level.

References

External links

1991 video games
Action video games
LJN games
Nintendo Entertainment System games
Nintendo Entertainment System-only games
Platform games
Software Creations games
Video games based on X-Men
Video games developed in the United Kingdom
Wolverine (comics) video games
Superhero video games